George Jacobs is an American bridge player, who lives in Chicago. 
Jacobs has won 11 North American Bridge Championships.

Jacobs is a monthly columnist with the American Contract Bridge League Bulletin magazine.

Bridge accomplishments

Awards

 Herman Trophy (2) 2000, 2001

Wins

 North American Bridge Championships (11)
 Lebhar IMP Pairs (1) 1999 
 Jacoby Open Swiss Teams (1) 2001 
 Vanderbilt (3) 1999, 2004, 2009 
 Mitchell Board-a-Match Teams (3) 2002, 2003, 2006 
 Reisinger (1) 2000 
 Spingold (2) 2001, 2002

Runners-up

 Bermuda Bowl (1) 2007 
 North American Bridge Championships (6)
 Silodor Open Pairs (1) 2005 
 Mitchell Board-a-Match Teams (1) 2001 
 Reisinger (3) 1998, 2001, 2005 
 Roth Open Swiss Teams (1) 2008

Notes

American contract bridge players
Bermuda Bowl players
Year of birth missing (living people)
Living people